Lac-des-Seize-Îles (French for Sixteen Islands Lake) is a village and municipality in the Laurentides region of Quebec, Canada, part of the Les Pays-d'en-Haut Regional County Municipality. The municipality surrounds and is named after Sixteen Island Lake (Lac des Seize Îles) with the village situated at the northern end of this lake.

Geography
The municipality is rectangular in shape, completely encompassing Sixteen Island Lake. Its descriptive name, which was in use as early as 1899 refers to its islands, however is a misnomer. There are in fact eighteen small islands on the lake, although the two smallest have no official name and have been judged too small for habitation:

One of the two unnamed islands is commonly referred to as 'Ile aux Bleuets', although Île Armitage was previously named as such.

The shores of Sixteen Island Lake and most of the islands are developed with cottages, making it a popular summer location when the population swells significantly. Most cottages are inaccessible by land and must be reached by boat.

History

Prior to European contact, this territory was occupied by the Weskarini Algonquin First Nation, and recent archaeological searches have uncovered 500-year old Huron and 700-year old Iriquoan pottery vases, suggesting the lake was possibly a meeting place.
 
The first pioneers arrived in this place in 1897, coming mainly from Saint-Joachim-de-Shefford and Roxton Falls. The post office opened a year later in 1898, identified under the English name of Sixteen Island Lake. In 1901, the mission of Notre-Dame-de-la-Sagesse was established and became a parish in 1937. In 1914, the Municipality of Lac-des-Seize-Îles was formed by separating from the Township Municipalities of Montcalm and Wentworth.

Pine Lake, located 1.5 km from Lac-des-Seize-Îles, received its first share of summer vacationers in 1907. A post office, identified as Lac-des-Pins, was serving vacationers between 1922 and 1954.

Demographics
Population trend:
 Population in 2016: 172 (2011 to 2016 population change: -22.9%)
 Population in 2011: 223 (2006 to 2011 population change: 39.4%)
 Population in 2006: 160 (2001 to 2006 population change: -33.9%)
 Population in 2001: 242
 Population in 1996: 184
 Population in 1991: 205

Private dwellings occupied by usual residents: 89 (total dwellings: 190)

Mother tongue:
 English as first language: 8.6%
 French as first language: 82.9%
 English and French as first language: 0%
 Other as first language: 5.7%

Education
The Sir Wilfrid Laurier School Board operates English-language public schools:
 Morin Heights Elementary School in Morin-Heights serves all of the town limits
 Laurentian Elementary School in Lachute also serves a portion
 Laurentian Regional High School in Lachute

See also
List of municipalities in Quebec

References

Incorporated places in Laurentides
Municipalities in Quebec